The Mongolian Revolutionary Youth League was a youth movement in the Mongolian People's Republic under the Mongolian People's Revolutionary Party meant for young people, both male and female.

History 
On August 25, 1921, on the initiative of General Damdin Sükhbaatar, a group of mostly students who had studied in the Russian Empire during the period of the Bogd Khanate, met in the capital and established the first Mongolian youth organization was established under the name of “Youth Union to Eliminate the Threshold”. At the outset, Khorloogiin Choibalsan, who served as the Deputy Chief of the Mongolian People's Army, was elected Chairman of the MRYL.

The main activity of the union was to propagate the policies and decisions of the Mongolian People's Revolutionary Party to the public. In 1922, at the Congress of the Revolutionary Youth of the East in Moscow, it established contacts with organizations such as the Comintern Communist Youth International and the Leninist Komsomol. The first congress was held in July 1922 in Ulaanbaatar.  At the twentieth congress in 1991, members established a new youth and community organization on the basis of the organization. On January 17, 1991, the Mongolian Youth Forum was organized, the Youth Association was established, and the association's declaration and charter were approved.

Subordinate organizations and influence 

 Sukhe Bator Mongolian Pioneers Organization

Up to one third of Mongolian People's Army units were members of the party and others were in the Mongolian Revolutionary Youth League.

Notable members 

 Peljidiin Genden
 Sükhbaataryn Yanjmaa
 Tsendiin Damdinsüren

Awards 

 Order of Military Merit (1931)
 Order of the Red Banner of Labor (1939)
Order of Sukhbaatar

See also 

 Komsomol
 Ernst Thälmann Pioneer Organisation
 Free German Youth

References 

Mongolian People's Party
Mongolian People's Republic
1921 establishments in Mongolia
1991 disestablishments in Mongolia